USS Rail may refer to the following ships of the United States Navy:

 , a single-screw, steel Lapwing-class minesweeper laid down on 15 December 1917 by the Puget Sound Navy Yard, Bremerton, Washington
 , laid down as LCI(L)-1022 by the Albina Engine & Machinery Works, Portland, Oregon, on 3 March 1944.

References 

United States Navy ship names